Alzingen is a town in the commune of Hesperange, in southern Luxembourg.  , the town has a population of 1,622.  

The town's main thoroughfare is the Route de Thionville, which runs from Thionville, France, to Luxembourg City.

Hesperange
Towns in Luxembourg
Alzette